Anthony C. Bongiovi (born September 7, 1947) is an American record producer and recording engineer. He is the cousin of musician Jon Bon Jovi.

Career
Bongiovi has produced records by Gloria Gaynor, Talking Heads, Aerosmith (Classics Live), and the Ramones (Rocket to Russia and Leave Home). Early in his career, he worked with artists such as Stevie Wonder, Marvin Gaye, and The Supremes. Later on, he recorded albums with artists such as Talking Heads and Jimi Hendrix (as well as some of Hendrix's posthumous releases under producer Alan Douglas).

In 1975, Bongiovi, along with partner Bob Walters, purchased a bankrupt building in Manhattan, New York City, from Mayor Ed Koch. Using his royalty checks from his previous records, Bongiovi was able to apply his ideas regarding acoustics to design and built his dream sound studios from the ground up. Since opening in 1977, The Power Station was used by renowned artists such as Bruce Springsteen, David Bowie, the Clash, and Pat Metheny. The studios have been described as one of the finest acoustic environments for recording in the world. In 1996  the studio, along with the rest of the building, was bought out of bankruptcy by Avatar Studios from Bongiovi.

In 2012, Bongiovi helped open Power Station Studios in Pompano Beach, Florida. He is also Managing Director and co-founder of BongioviAcoustic Labs, headquartered in Port St. Lucie, Florida. Here he has developed a suite of algorithms called Bongiovi Acoustic Labs DPS (Digital Power Station), enabling  engineers the ability to produce recordings with studio-like sound.

Personal life
He is a second cousin of Jon Bon Jovi, who is the lead singer of the band Bon Jovi.

Production and engineering credits

1972: Hypnotized - Martha Veléz
1975: Never Can Say Goodbye - Gloria Gaynor
1975: Crash Landing - Jimi Hendrix
1975: Midnight Lightning - Jimi Hendrix
1975: Are You Ready For Freddy? - Freddy Fender
1975: Experience Gloria Gaynor - Gloria Gaynor
1976: I've Got You - Gloria Gaynor
1977: Leave Home - The Ramones
1977: Rocket to Russia - The Ramones
1977: Talking Heads '77 - Talking Heads
1977: Tailgunner - Jimmy McGriff (recording and remix engineer)
1977: Star Wars and Other Galactic Funk - Meco
1978: Encounters of Every Kind - Meco
1978: Ace Frehley - Ace Frehley
1979: This Is My Life (La Vita) with Meco - Shirley Bassey
1980: Christmas in the Stars: Star Wars Christmas Album - Meco
1980: 1978-80: 1978-1980 Six Singles - Al Downing
1980: The Empire Strikes Back - Meco
1981: Balance - Balance
1982: I'll Be Loving You - Al Downing
1982: Darlene - Al Downing
1982: Big Al Downing - Al Downing
1982: Rock in a Hard Place - Aerosmith
1982: In for the Count - Balance
1983: Bark at the Moon - Ozzy Osbourne
1983: Superstar - Lydia Murdock
1984: Bon Jovi - Bon Jovi
1984: Love on the Line - Lydia Murdock
1990: Back for Another Taste - Helix - co-producer
2005: Boo! B***h - Mystery - co producer with Steven Gagnon
2002: Sympathy - Goo Goo Dolls
2005: As Above So Below - NoEnd

Others produced
Jodi Bongiovi
Cidny Bullens
Carlene Carter
Rick Derringer
Mike DeVille
Buck Dharma
Carol Douglas
The Electriks
Barry Goudreau
Gus & The New Breed
Millie Jackson
The Rezillos
Sylvain Sylvain
Tuff Darts
Samantha Sang
Marlena Shaw

References

External links
Tony Bongiovi Interview NAMM Oral History Library (2017)
BongioviAcoustic Labs

1947 births
Living people
People from Raritan, New Jersey
American audio engineers
Record producers from New Jersey
Amateur radio people
Jon Bon Jovi